"Can You Keep a Secret?" is a song by Hikaru Utada, released as their seventh Japanese-language single (9th overall) on February 16, 2001. It was the ending theme song for a Japanese television drama called Hero, in which Utada had their acting debut, appearing in a cameo as a waitress, and starring Takuya Kimura. "Can You Keep a Secret?" debuted at number one on the Oricon chart, selling 783,620 in its first week, and was their third single to be number one for two consecutive weeks. 1.31 million copies were shipped to stores in a single day. The single has sold 1,485,000 to date and became the number one single of 2001 in Japan. In the World Charts, "Can You Keep a Secret?" reached number 37 for single airplay and number 9 for sales. The most recent figures (May 26, 2006) show that the single sold 1,484,940 units in total. It also remains one of Utada's fan favorites.

The music video for this song includes a robot whom Hikaru appears to be in a relationship with. The robot used in the video was the robot "Pino" (short for "Pinocchio") created by Hisashi Taniguchi.

Utada performed "Can You Keep a Secret?" on their 2010 tour, Utada: In the Flesh 2010.

Track listing

Charts
Japan (Oricon)

References

Hikaru Utada songs
2001 singles
Oricon Weekly number-one singles
Songs written by Hikaru Utada
Japanese television drama theme songs
2001 songs
EMI Music Japan singles
+